CAPB may refer to:

 Cocamidopropyl betaine
 EPH receptor B2, a receptor tyrosine kinases